Absolute Design is the debut album from Swedish melodic death metal/industrial band Engel. The album was released in Europe on October 31, 2007, while the North American release date was May 20, 2008. Music videos were released for "Casket Closing", "Next Closed Door" and "Calling Out".

Track listing 
 “In Splendour” – 3:42
 “Casket Closing” – 3:27
 “Next Closed Door” – 3:14
 “The Hurricane Season” – 3:37
 “Propaganda” – 3:24
 “The Paraclete” – 3:25
 “Scythe” – 4:57
 “Descend” – 4:51
 “Trial and Error” – 3:23
 “I Am the One” – 3:51
 “Calling Out” – 4:28
 “Seven Ends” – 4:16

Credits 
 Magnus "Mangan" Klavborn – vocals
 Niclas Engelin – guitars
 Marcus Sunesson – guitars
 Michael Håkansson – bass
 Daniel "Mojjo" Moilanen – drums

References 

2007 debut albums
Engel (band) albums
SPV/Steamhammer albums